Miloslav Mečíř was the defending champion, but did not compete this year.

Emilio Sánchez won the title by defeating Guillermo Pérez Roldán 6–3, 6–1, 3–6, 6–3 in the final.

Seeds

Draw

Finals

Top half

Bottom half

References

External links
 Official results archive (ATP)
 Official results archive (ITF)

Dutch Open (tennis)
1988 Grand Prix (tennis)